No Protection is Justin Lo's second album, released on March 24, 2006. It is released in preparation and promotion of his concert, One Good Show.

Track listing
"Intro"
"決戰二世祖" (Battle Against the Rich Man's Son)
"運" 
"Kong" 
"夢女" 
"Volar" 
"情永落"
"美麗之最"
"走音" 
"得來不易"
"You'll Shine Again" 
"Dream Away"
"Deez....."

External links
Justin in YesAsia.com
Justin in Yahoo! Music

References

Justin Lo albums
2006 albums